Maison Bertaux is a French pâtisserie in Greek Street, Soho, London. The shop began in 1871, making it the oldest pâtisserie in London.

Maison Bertaux
Maison Bertaux was founded in 1871 by a French communard from Paris named Monsieur Bertaux. It is situated at 28 Greek Street, Soho, London, next door to the Coach and Horses pub; Maison Bertaux is the oldest pâtisserie shop in London. It is no accident that the shop opened at this location for it was in the heart of the French community in London in the late 19th century. The historic French Protestant church is in nearby Soho Square, while the Catholic Notre Dame de France is in Leicester Place.

Since 1988, the managers of Maison Bertaux are sisters Michele and Tania Wade; Michele has been at the pâtisserie since she was 17 years old. When they started to manage the shop, the shop only served one type of tea; it now serves twenty varieties. In 2000, the pâtisserie delivered a traditional wedding cake to a Birmingham wedding party. The pâtisserie contains a piano with a copy of The Art of French Baking on top of it, and three of the mirrors in the shop contain the inscriptions Liberté, égalité, fraternité. To celebrate Bastille Day, the shop creates a Tableau vivant. The shop is situated near to the former location of Central Saint Martins art school, and also has an art gallery situated on the upper floor, which is run by Tania Wade. In 2013, the gallery hosted an exhibition of Harry Hill's paintings of celebrities including Bruce Forsyth, Ken Livingstone and Anthea Turner. The upper floor is also used as party venue with a capacity 20.

Visitors to the pâtisserie have included Derek Jarman, Steve McQueen, Howard Hodgkin, Grayson Perry, Nicole Kidman, Noel Fielding,  Damon Albarn, Martin Freeman,  John Hurt and Bob Geldof. The pâtisserie also made Lily Allen's wedding cake, and hosted Alexander McQueen's 25th birthday party.

In 2020, Maison Bertaux set up a crowdfunding campaign to save the shop, after it was forced to close due to the coronavirus pandemic.

Notes

References

External links
 Official website

1871 establishments in England
Food and drink companies established in 1871
Pâtisserie
Shops in London
Coffeehouses and cafés in London
Soho, London
Greek Street